Doug Haines is an American attorney and politician who served as a member of the Georgia State Senate for the 46th district from 2001 to 2003.

Early life and education 
A native of Laramie, Wyoming, Haines is the son of a teacher and banker. He has two siblings, including a twin sister. Haines earned a Bachelor of Arts degree in political science from the University of Wyoming and a Juris Doctor from the University of Georgia School of Law.

Career 
After law school, Haines worked as an attorney in Atlanta for three years before returning to Athens. In 1992, Haines established Georgia Legal Watch, a non-profit public interest law group. Haines was elected to the Georgia State Senate in 2000, succeeded retiring incumbent Paul C. Broun Sr. He was defeated for re-election in 2002 by Brian Kemp. Haines was a candidate for Georgia's 12th congressional district in the 2004, losing in the Democratic primary.

Personal life 
Haines is married to Lisa Lott, a former public defender and current judge of the Georgia Superior Court. Haines and Lott have two children.

In 2004, Haines was charged with assault after an incident of road rage. Haines was later sentenced to 40 hours of community service and a mandatory anger management evaluation in 2005.

References 

Living people
Politicians from Athens, Georgia
Georgia (U.S. state) lawyers
Democratic Party Georgia (U.S. state) state senators
University of Wyoming alumni
University of Georgia School of Law alumni
Year of birth missing (living people)